Sinking Sands is a 2010 Ghanaian drama film written, produced and directed by Leila Djansi, and starring Jimmy Jean-Louis, Ama Abebrese, Emmanuel Yeboah A. and Yemi Blaq. The film received nine (9) nominations and won 3 awards at the 2011 Africa Movie Academy Awards, including the awards for Best Screenplay & Best Makeup.

Premise 
The film tells the story of a couple, Jimah and Pabi, whose marriage turns into violence and abuse when Jimah becomes disfigured in a domestic accident.

Cast
Jimmy Jean-Louis as  Jimah
Ama Abebrese as Pabi
 Yemi Blaq  as Dr Zach Mathews
 Chris Attoh as Mensah
 Doris Sakitey as Mrs. Dodou
 Grace Nortey as Grandma
 Narki Adulai as Wedding Guest
 Louis Marcus as Jimahs' friend
 Daphne Akatugba as Patience
 Faustina Aheto as Mourner
 Avissey Gbormitah as man under the tree
 Amanda Jissie as Ms Olu
 Trustina Fafa Sarbah as Stella
 Mrs. Julia Djansi as Panel Member
 Eddie Coffie as Obed
 Peter Etse  as Priest
 Akosua Agyepong as Mama May
 Joe Akpali as Bank Manager
 Valarie Kessie as Harlott
 Archibald Etse as Son
 Afi Dzakpasu as Singer at Bar
 Samir Yaw White as Mourner
 Natascha Mieke as Dr. Samantha Rogers
 Michelle Hogba as herself
 Lawrence Hanson as Panel member

Reception 
The film was positively received by many African movie critics with NollywoodForever.com concluding that "A wonderful movie that I would recommend in a heartbeat. This shows to all those narrow-minded people that believe that you need glitz, glamour and brazilian weave to make a good movie that you DO NOT. The rawness in the movie was breathtaking and to be applauded. The acting was on point as was the cinematography."

References

External links
 
 

2010 films
2010 drama films
Ghanaian drama films
Best Screenplay Africa Movie Academy Award winners
Best Makeup Africa Movie Academy Award winners
2010s English-language films
English-language Ghanaian films
Films directed by Leila Djansi